Solar is an album by jazz musician Red Garland, recorded in 1962 and released the same year on Jazzland as JLP 73.

Track listing 
"Sophisticated Swing" (Hudson, Parish) - 5:31
"Solar" (Miles Davis/Chuck Wayne) - 5:03
"Where Are You?" (Adamson, McHugh) - 5:17
"Marie's Delight" (Garland) - 3:33
"This Can't Be Love" (Rodgers, Hart) - 4:08
"The Very Thought of You" (Ray Noble) - 5:29
"Blues For 'News" (Garland) - 3:24
"I Just Can't See for Lookin'" (Nadine Robinson, Dok Stanford) - 5:46

Personnel 
 Red Garland - piano
 Les Spann - guitar, flute (#3, 6)
 Sam Jones - bass
 Frank Gant - drums

References 

1962 albums
Albums produced by Orrin Keepnews
Riverside Records albums
Red Garland albums